Andrzej Trepka (1923–2009) was a Polish journalist and science fiction writer.

1923 births
2009 deaths
Polish science fiction writers
20th-century Polish journalists